Le Gerny's is the name of a former Parisian nightclub located at 54 rue Pierre-Charron, at the intersection with the , in the  of the 8th arrondissement of Paris.

The nightclub is now mostly known as the venue where internationally renowned singer-songwriter Edith Piaf, made her professional debut, after its owner and director Louis Leplee, spotted her singing on a Paris street, and promoted her giving her the nickname "la môme Piaf", (The Little Sparrow) in October 1935, when performing at his club, with a 40 francs salary per evening.

See also 
 List of theatres and entertainment venues in Paris

Cabarets in Paris 
Former theatres in Paris 
8th arrondissement of Paris